Xesta is a genus of air-breathing land snails, terrestrial pulmonate gastropod mollusks in the subfamily Ariophantinae of the family Ariophantidae.

Species
 Xesta aulica (L. Pfeiffer, 1854)
 Xesta citrina (Linnaeus, 1758)
 Xesta comorensis (Morelet, 1881)
 Xesta complicata Iredale, 1941
 Xesta cornecerea Iredale, 1941
 Xesta dimidiata E. A. Smith, 1896
 Xesta dinawa Iredale, 1941
 Xesta fraudulenta (E. A. Smith, 1887)
 Xesta injecta Iredale, 1941
 Xesta kaledupana Möllendorff, 1902
 Xesta luctuosa
 Xesta obiana Möllendorff, 1902
 Xesta oldhamiana Iredale, 1941
 Xesta perfragilis Möllendorff, 1902
 Xesta rufostrigata Fulton, 1921
 Xesta srijohnabbasae Thach, 2020
 Xesta steursi (Shuttleworth, 1852)
 Xesta taibaishanensis J. Lin, W.-C. Zhou & D.-N. Chen, 2007
 Xesta tomiana Möllendorff, 1902
 Xesta tritoniensis (Le Guillou, 1842)
Taxa inquirenda
 Xesta ahlburgi Leschke, 1914 
 Xesta kalaoensis E. A. Smith, 1896 
 Xesta langemaki Leschke, 1912 
 Xesta padasensis E. A. Smith, 1895 
 Xesta strubelli O. Boettger, 1891 
 Xesta thisbe E. A. Smith, 1895 
Species brought into synonymy
 Xesta (Corneoxesta) Iredale, 1941: synonym of Xesta Albers, 1850 (junior synonym)
 Xesta carinocincta E. A. Smith, 1899: synonym of Elaphroconcha carinocincta (E. A. Smith, 1899) (original combination)
 Xesta cincta "Lea, 1834" sensu P. Sarasin & F. Sarasin, 1898: synonym of Naninia steursi (Shuttleworth, 1852): synonym of Xesta steursi (Shuttleworth, 1852) (based on unavailable original name)
 Xesta cumingi (L. Pfeiffer, 1849): synonym of Helicarion cumingii (L. Pfeiffer, 1849) (unaccepted generic combination)
 Xesta dwipana Gude, 1903: synonym of Durgella pusilla (Martens, 1867) (original combination)
 Xesta everetti E. A. Smith, 1897: synonym of Asperitas everetti (E. A. Smith, 1897) (original combination)
 Xesta malaouyi de Morgan, 1885: synonym of Hemiplecta malaouyi (de Morgan, 1885) (original combination)
 Xesta melanoraphe E. A. Smith, 1897: synonym of Asperitas trochus melanoraphe (E. A. Smith, 1897) (original combination)
 Xesta mindanaensis C. Semper, 1870: synonym of Hemiplecta mindanaensis (C. Semper, 1870) (original combination)
 Xesta notabilis B. Rensch, 1930: synonym of Asperitas notabilis (Rensch, 1930) (original combination)
 Xesta piperata Fulton, 1901: synonym of Kalidos piperatus (Fulton, 1901) (original combination)
 Xesta polymorpha E. A. Smith, 1897: synonym of Asperitas trochus polymorpha (E. A. Smith, 1897) (original combination)
 Xesta renitens (Morelet, 1861): synonym of Macrochlamys renitens (Morelet, 1861) (unaccepted combination)
 Xesta rookmaakeri B. Rensch, 1930: synonym of Asperitas rookmaakeri (B. Rensch, 1930) (original combination)
 Xesta rugosissima (Möllendorff, 1903): synonym of Asperitas trochus (O. F. Müller, 1774) (junior synonym)
 Xesta selayarensis E. A. Smith, 1896: synonym of Asperitas trochus selayarensis (E. A. Smith, 1896) (original combination)
 Xesta subpolita E. A. Smith, 1897: synonym of Asperitas bimaensis subpolita (E. A. Smith, 1897) (original combination)
 Xesta themis E. A. Smith, 1895: synonym of Everettia themis (E. A. Smith, 1895) (original combination)
 Xesta trochus (O. F. Müller, 1774): synonym of Asperitas trochus (O. F. Müller, 1774) (superseded combination)

References

External links

 Albers, J. C. (1850). Die Heliceen nach natürlicher Verwandtschaft systematisch geordnet. Berlin: Enslin. 262 pp.
 Gray, J. E. (1834). [Several shells, which … referred to a genus to be separated from Helix under the name of Nanina.. Proceedings of the Zoological Society of London. (1834) 2: 58-59]
 Iredale, T. (1941). A basic list of the land Mollusca of Papua. The Australian Zoologist. 10(1): 51-94, pls. 3-4
 Albers, J. C.; Martens, E. von. (1860). Die Heliceen nach natürlicher Verwandtschaft systematisch geordnet von Joh. Christ. Albers. Ed. 2. Pp. i-xviii, 1-359. Leipzig: Engelman

 Ariophantidae